Cordemais is a commune situated in the Loire-Atlantique department in western France.

Economy
Cordemais Power Station is located in the town.

Population

See also
Communes of the Loire-Atlantique department

References

Communes of Loire-Atlantique